This article lists the main target shooting events and their results for 2020.

World Events

2020 Olympic Games
The 2020 Olympic Games in Tokyo were postponed until 2021.

 Shooting at the 2020 Summer Olympics – Qualification
 Shooting at the 2020 Summer Olympics
 Shooting at the 2020 Summer Paralympics – Qualification
 Shooting at the 2020 Summer Paralympics

International Shooting Sport Federation

ISSF World Cup
 2020 ISSF World Cup

FITASC
2020 Results

Regional Events

Africa

Americas

Asia

Europe

European Shooting Confederation
 February 23 - March 1: 2020 European 10 m Events Championships in Wrocław, Poland

"B Matches"
 February 6-8: InterShoot, held in Den Haag, Netherlands

National Events

United Kingdom

NRA Imperial Meeting
 October, held at the National Shooting Centre, Bisley A mini-Imperial was held between lockdowns, with social-distancing enabled by the outdoor nature of fullbore rifle shooting.
 Queen's Prize winner: 
 Grand Aggregate winner:

References

 
2020 in sports
2020 sport-related lists
2020s in shooting sports